The Catholic Church in Botswana is part of the worldwide Catholic Church, under the spiritual leadership of the Pope in the Vatican City. Catholics represent about 5-6% of the total population.

History
Initially Catholic missionaries were not allowed in Botswana by native tribes at the urging of Protestant missionaries who arrived first. Missionaries began to work in Botswana in 1928, and were noted for setting up schools and clinics. In 2006 the church in Francistown started a program to treat refugees infected with AIDS with anti retro viral therapy. As of 2011 there were thirteen seminarians preparing for the priesthood in Botswana.

Organization
The church in Botswana is organized into the Diocese of Gaborone, which serves the southern portion of the country, and the Diocese of Francistown, which serves the faithful of northern communities.

References

 
Botswana
Botswana